SPR Highliving District is a residential complex consisting of three residential skyscrapers in the neighbourhood of Perambur in Chennai, India. The tallest of them is a 45-storied building, which is the tallest residential building in Chennai.

History
In the 2019 Global Investors Meet, the SPR India, a real estate developer in South India, signed an MoU with the Tamil Nadu government to invest 55,000 million towards real estate projects in the state. Part of this investment is an approximately 65-acre integrated township at the Binny Mills in Perambur. Construction began in 2018 and was completed in 2020.

Location
The towers are located on a plot of 18 acres known as the SPR Highliving Towers, which is part of the 63.89-acre SPR City Chennai's largest integrated township in Perambur. The residential apartments has three towers in the first phase and a 3.5-acre park, which is said to be the largest private park in the city.

The towers

The three towers together  have 684 apartments. Tower A will have 216 apartments, Tower B will have 288, and Tower H will have 162.5. The towers will have double basement floor, ground floor and 2 upper floors for shops, and the residential floors raising up to 48 floors.

The township has a total built-up area of 5.5 million sq ft, including a three million sq ft of shopping area and 2.5 million sq ft of residential infrastructure, warehousing and parking.

It also houses a leading cricket academy and a leading badminton academy. The Shri Ram Universal School has already commenced its operations in the township. The township also includes 11-screened theatre, commercial trade center, and the country's largest multi-commodity wholesale trade centre known as the Market of India, which will have more than 5,000 shops and 300 retail outlets. The integrated township project is expected to generate more than 133,000 employment opportunities, both direct and indirect.

An approval from AAI for a maximum height of 243m has also been received. A hospital tower of 12 floors and a mall and an IT park have also been proposed as a part of Phase 2.

Planned developments
Of the buildings planned to be built in the second phase of SPR City, Towers C, E, F, G will rise to a height of 161 m and Tower D to a height of 243 m. With 70 floors, Tower D will be the tallest skyscraper in the city upon completion.

See also

 List of tallest buildings in Chennai

References

External links
 Official website of the apartment complex

Skyscraper residential buildings in Chennai
Residential buildings completed in 2020